Indurkani, also known as Zianagar, is an upazila, or sub-district, of the Pirojpur District in Barisal Division, Bangladesh.

History
On 28 July 1980, President Ziaur Rahman turned Indurkani river police station into a full police station. On 21 April 2002, Prime Minister Khaleda Zia renamed Indurkani into Zianagar Upazila. On 9 January 2017, the National Implementation Committee for Administrative Reform led by Prime Minister Sheikh Hasina renamed Zianagar Upazila back to Indurkani Upazila.

Administration
Indurkani Upazila is divided into three union parishads: Balipara, Parerhat, and Pattashi. The union parishads are subdivided into 29 mauzas and 48 villages.

References

Upazilas of Pirojpur District